Eleven ships of the Royal Navy have been named HMS Scorpion after the carnivorous arthropod, or the scorpion, a ballistic weapon in use in the Roman army:

  was a 14-gun  sloop launched in 1746. She sank in the Irish Sea in 1762.
 HMS Scorpion was the mercantile Borryan, purchased in January 1771, and commissioned as the 8-gun fireship . She was converted to a sloop in August 1771 and renamed Scorpion. She took part in Tryon's Raid on the Connecticut coast in 1779. She became one of the infamous Hudson River prison ships sometime after.  The American poet Philip Morin Freneau was captured by the British in 1780 and imprisoned on HMS Scorpion; he wrote a harrowing first-person a poem in four cantos about his six- week ordeal titled "The British Prison Ships". It is considered "his best-known revolutionary poem". Scorpion was sold in 1780. 
  was a 16-gun Echo-class sloop launched in 1785 and sold in 1802. She apparently became the whaler and letter of marque Scorpion. She worked in the South Seas whale fishery until the Spaniards captured her in 1808.
  was a gunvessel purchased in 1794 and sold in 1804
  was a  launched in 1803 and sold in 1819.
  was a  brig-sloop launched in 1832, converted to a survey vessel in 1848 and on loan to the Thames Police from 1858. She was broken up in 1874.
  was a turret ship, one of two being constructed for the Confederate States of America under the cover story that they were intended for Egypt; the British Government seized them before they were launched in 1863. Scorpion sank in 1903 while being towed for scrapping.
  was a  launched in 1910 and sold for scrapping in 1921.
  was a river gunboat launched in 1937 and sunk by Japanese destroyers in Banka Strait in 1942.
  was an S-class destroyer launched in 1942 and sold to the Netherlands in 1945.
  was a  destroyer launched in 1946 and scrapped in 1971.

Citations and references

Royal Navy ship names